Koldbrann ("Gangrene") is a Norwegian black metal band founded in 2001.

Musically Koldbrann, like countrymen 1349, play very orthodox black metal in the classic Norwegian mould and have also received favorable comparisons to early Gorgoroth, Mayhem and Darkthrone. Much of the praise directed at the band has therefore been centered on their songwriting and reproduction of the old sound of the Norwegian scene.

Koldbrann have been very vocal about their distaste for drum triggers, featuring anti-trigger notifications on two of their full-length albums.

History
They recorded two demos in 2002 and their first album Nekrotisk Inkvisition one year later. It was originally limited to 333 units, but due to several recent re-releases more than five thousand have been released. After releasing a split EP with Ljå and the Atomvinter EP the band moved to German label Twilight Vertrieb for the release of their second album Moribund, which featured guest appearances by Iblis and L. Wachtfels from Endstille (who are on the same label). It was followed by a split with Faustcoven and a tour with Negator and Sarkom. In the year 2007 they toured with Taake and Urgehal and appeared at the 2007 edition of Oslo's Inferno Metal Festival. They also embarked on the same year on a tour of Eastern Europe with Marduk.

In 2009 they toured with Shining, they performed again in Inferno, and performed at Barther Metal Open Air in Germany.

Discography

Studio albums
 Nekrotisk Inkvisition (2003)
 Moribund (2006)
 Vertigo (2013)

EPs
 Skamslåtte engler/Fredløs (2004) – split single with Ljå.
 Atomvinter (2006)
 Pogrom Pestilent (2006) – split single with Faustcoven.
 Stigma: På kant med livet (2008)
 Russian Vodka / Metalni Bog (2009, Corrosia Metalla/Bombarder cover)
 Totalt Sjelelig Bankerott (2012)

Demos
 Pre-Prod 2002 (2002)
 Mislyder fra Det Nekrotiske Kammer (2002) – rehearsal tape.

DVDs
 Live at Ragnarök Festival 2007 (2007) – official bootleg.

Band members

Current members
 Mannevond – vocals (2001–present)
 Kvass – guitar (2001–present)
 Leonid Melnikov – drums (2021-present)
 Voidar - guitars (2009-present)

Former members
 Dragev – guitar (2002)
 Jonas aus Slavia – bass (2002–2003)
 Fordervelse (Tom V. Nilsen) – drums (2001–2009)
 Geir Antonsen – guitar (2004–2009)
 Stian Johnskareng – bass (2003–2013)
 Folkedal - drums (2009-?)

Live members
 General Kshatriya – guitar (1 show, 2003)
 Mpress – bass (2 shows, 2003)
 Kjøttring – bass (1 show, 2003)
 Desecrator - bass (2014-present)

Touring history 
 Balkan Inkvisition 2003 - 5 dates (Balkan, Headliner)
 German Inkvisition 2004 - 11 dates (Europe, w/Endstille) 
 Black Hordes Over Europe 2006 - 10 dates (Europe, Headliner)
 Moribund Balkan Tour 2006 - 5 dates (Balkan, Headliner)
 Black Hordes Over Europe pt. II 2007 - 15 dates (Europe, w/Taake)
 Werewolf Tour 2007 - 14 dates (Eastern Europe, w/Marduk) 9 dates cancelled

References

External links 

 
 Official MySpace site

Norwegian black metal musical groups
Musical groups established in 2001
2001 establishments in Norway
Season of Mist artists
Musical groups from Norway with local place of origin missing